Kraljevica (known as Porto Re in Italian and literally translated as "King's cove" in English) is a town in the Kvarner region of Croatia, located between Rijeka and Crikvenica, approximately thirty kilometers from Opatija and near the entrance to the bridge to the island of Krk. The population of the settlement of Kraljevica itself is 2,857 with a total of 4,618 in the area of the Town of Kraljevica, which is part of Primorje-Gorski Kotar County, and includes Šmrika. The town is known for its shipyard which has built a number of ships for the Croatian navy.

History
Kraljevica is a town that was written about as early as the 13th century. Today, in addition to having the oldest shipyard on the Adriatic, Kraljevica's skyline is dominated by two medieval castles and a church of the Croatian nobles Zrinski and Frankopan. Kraljevica's shipyard employed Josip Broz Tito, the former leader of Yugoslavia, during the first half of the 20th century in his early years of organizing for the Communist Party. After he became marshal of Yugoslavia following World War II the shipyard took his name, until democratic changes in the 1990s. Kraljevica was the site of an Italian-run concentration camp during WW II.

Today Kraljevica is also a popular tourist destination on the Adriatic coast. The Krk Bridge is located nearby, in the southeast part of the city.

Population

References

Cities and towns in Croatia
Populated places in Primorje-Gorski Kotar County